"No Future in the Past" is a song co-written and recorded by American country music singer Vince Gill.  It was released in March 1993 as the third single from his CD I Still Believe in You.  The song peaked at number 3 on the Billboard Hot Country Singles & Tracks (now Hot Country Songs) chart.  It was written by Gill and Carl Jackson.

Chart performance

Year-end charts

References

1993 singles
1992 songs
Vince Gill songs
Song recordings produced by Tony Brown (record producer)
Songs written by Vince Gill
MCA Records singles